= The Josh Carrick Foundation =

British testicular cancer charity

The Josh Carrick Foundation is a British charity established in 2012, dedicated to testicular cancer awareness and fundraising research into treatment. It was set up by the family of Josh Carrick, who died of the disease in October 2011 at the age of 23.

== Josh Carrick ==
Josh Carrick, from Luton, was the son of Steve and Arlene Carrick and the twin brother of Dominic.Josh Carrick was a University of Nottingham alumnus who graduated with a degree in computer science. He died from testicular cancer on 3 October 2011, aged 23.

== Foundation ==
The charity was set up in October 2012, and had raised £50,000 by October 2013. By March 2016 it had raised more than £300,000. It works together with Cancer Research UK, IBM, and the University of Nottingham. IBM offers £100 to the best first-year student in the university's Computer Science department, and offers visits to their laboratories for the top five. The money raised for Cancer Research UK has funded a study on the link between testicular cancer survivors and cardiovascular disease, and a laboratory for a metastasis specialist. A bicycle ride from London to Brighton raised £22,000.

British Prime Minister David Cameron awarded Steve and Arlene Carrick the 496th and 497th Points of Light, a daily award for charity fundraisers. The charity has been highlighted in national newspapers. It was the charity of choice at the 2015 RESI Awards.
